Dimitrios Stroumpos (1806 - February 5, 1890) was an astronomer, physicist, mathematician, author, and professor.  He was a theoretical physicist.  He was a pioneer in 19th-century Greek physics.  He helped develop the physics department at the University of Athens.  He was the dean.  He did extensive research in the field of physics namely: the study of air and energy fields,  electricity, magnetism, and telephones.  He also studied the motion of molecules and developed a system of scientific observation.  He developed the Strombo compass.  His contemporaries at the time were Greek scientists Vassilios Lakon, Georgios Konstantinos Vouris, and Ioannis Papadakis.  He was replaced as the chair of the physics department by his student world-renowned physicist Timoleon Argyropoulos after his death.
 
Dimitrios was born in Koukouli, Ioannina.  He was part of a very important family.  The family eventually migrated to Corfu.  Both Dimitrios and his brother were educated overseas.  Dimitrios attended two prestigious institutions in Europe.  He attended the University of Geneva and the École polytechnique.  He was inspired by Henri Victor Regnault.  He eventually moved back to Greece and became part of the University of Athens.  He was also an instructor at   
Evelpidon.  He was part of the movement to eradicate the religious suppression of science.  The Christian religion surpassed new scientific ideas for hundreds of years within the Greek community.  A notable incident was the Methodios Affair.  Dimitrios represented the dawn of a new era of scientific thought in Greece.  He researched and promoted every new physics idea and kept open communication with all the prominent European scientists at the time.

Biography 
Dimitrios was born in 1806 in the village of Koukouli, Ioannina.  His grandfather was Konstantinos.  He was a very wealthy Greek merchant from Koukouli, Ioannina. Konstantinos had two children Stefanos and Georgios.  Dimitri's father was Stefanos.  His uncle was Georgios.  Dimitrios completed his basic education in Ioannina.  His teacher was prominent educator Athanassios Sakellarios.  The family moved to Patras after the Greek War of Independence in 1830.  Dimitrios and his brother Petros Stroumbos studied at the Ionian Academy.  Ioannis Kapodistrias sent Dimitrios and Petros to study in Europe on a scholarship from the Greek government.   Dimitrios studied mathematics and physics his brother studied law.  Dimitrios initially studied physics at the University of Geneva in Switzerland and  he also traveled to Paris to study at the École polytechnique.  Records indicate he was at the École polytechnique in 1829 and 1852 indicating that he continued to advance his education with the evolving technologies of the time.  André-Marie Ampère and Joseph Fourier were notable faculty associated with the institution at the time. Notable students attending the prestigious school while Dimitrios was at the institution were: Henri Victor Regnault, Joseph Louis François Bertrand, Auguste Bravais and Hervé Faye.  Dimitrios graduated with a Phd with the highest honors.  He returned to Athens in 1838 and began work at  Evelpidon.  He also became a professor at the newly founded University of Athens.  He was an adjunct professor from 1839-1844 and full professor from 1844-1890. 
    
The newly founded monarchy was full of problems.  There was constant friction between the rebels that founded the new state and King Otto.  The palace of the king was completed and a huge rebellion ensued known as the Rebellion of the 3rd of September in 1843.  The rebels demanded a constitutional monarchy and the departure of the Bavarian officials.  The university played a vital role in politics since its inception.  Stroumpos and other faculty members were constantly dragged into the political debate.  Higher education played a crucial role in politics.  Regrettably, one of the most important Greek-Austrian astronomers Georgios Konstantinos Vouris was sent back to Austria due to the political uncertainty and his association with the Kings motherland during the 1850s.  Dimitrios was named the dean of the  University of Athens from 1858 to 1859.  During this time his grade school teacher Athanassios Sakellarios received a Phd from the University.

He gave a notable speech in September 1858.  Stroumpos gave an incredible speech outlining the importance of modern scientific advancement.  Early in his speech he discussed Francis Bacon, Galileo Galilei, and Isaac Newtown.  The three scientists formed the basis of his scientific knowledge.  He saw them as heroes that were persecuted and unrecognized.  He criticized the church's persecution of scientific education for hundreds of years and corydalism.  He also emphasized the importance of following the modern scientific advancements of the time.  He discussed the work of his classmate Henri Victor Regnault.  He also named the academic research of Edmond Becquerel and Michael Faraday.  He also equated Michael Faraday to the genius of sir Isaac Newton.  Towards the end of his historic speech he made six points about scientific advancement a) sciences independence from religion was crucial, b) he stressed the importance of experimental method, c) the search for truth, d) investigation on how the world was created, he was inline with darwins theory of evolution, e) scientists should search for natural laws to explain all phenomena, and f) special theories or hypotheses should be established to explain all phenomena.  

On May 10, 1859, a political incident called the skiadika (σκιαδικά) occurred involving students of the University and Stroumbos.  By October 1862, King Otto was exiled to never return to Greece.  By the late 1860s, his student was Greek physicist Timoleon Argyropoulos.  He decided to study in France following the path of Stroumpos.  Stroumpos was in constant communication with the international scientific community namely France.  He was constantly publishing research articles in different periodicals.  In the 1880s he invented an instrument for measuring magnetic declination and inclination known as the stroumbo compass.  He did extensive research on Archimedes' principle and air.  He also introduced new European concepts to Greek higher education.  He studied the weights of objects.  He did extensive research on the function of levers. He used atwood's machine to demonstrate classical mechanics.  He theorized that static electricity directly produces the same effect as dynamic electricity, without the intervention of any electric current.  He researched the works of Wilhelm Holtz namely dealing with electric machines.  He also studied the electromagnetism and refraction of light.  He was part of the rise of the wave theory of light and optical theory.  He wrote countless books and articles on different physical processes.  By now Greek scientists began to utilize the mathematical interpretation of the physical world and contributed to the founding of modern physics.  He died in Athens on February 5, 1890.

Literary Works

See also
Birefringence
Electrostatic generator

References

Bibliography 

19th-century Greek educators
19th-century Greek scientists
19th-century Greek astronomers
19th-century Greek physicists
19th-century Greek mathematicians
Academic staff of the National and Kapodistrian University of Athens
People from Zagori